A geodesic metric space  is called tree-graded space, with respect to a collection of connected proper subsets called pieces, if any two distinct pieces intersect by at most one point, and every non-trivial simple geodesic triangle of  is contained in one of the pieces.

Thus, for pieces of bounded diameter, tree-graded spaces behave like real trees in their coarse geometry (in the sense of Gromov), while allowing non-tree-like behavior within the pieces.

References
.

Metric geometry
Trees (topology)